Events in the year 1875 in Brazil.

Incumbents
Monarch – Pedro II
Prime Minister – Viscount of Rio Branco (until 25 June), Duke of Caxias (starting 25 June)

References

 
1870s in Brazil
Years of the 19th century in Brazil
Brazil
Brazil